Beeston may refer to:

People 
 Beeston (surname)

Places in the United Kingdom 

Beeston, Bedfordshire, a hamlet
Beeston, Cheshire, a village and civil parish
Beeston Castle
Beeston, Leeds, West Yorkshire, a suburb of Leeds
Beeston railway station (West Yorkshire)
Beeston, Norfolk, a village
Beeston Regis
Beeston St Andrew
the former parish of Beeston St Lawrence now part of Ashmanhaugh
the parish of Beeston with Bittering
Beeston Beck (Norfolk), a minor watercourse 
Beeston, Nottinghamshire, a town in Nottinghamshire
Beeston railway station
Beeston (UK Parliament constituency)
Beeston Urban District
 Beeston Tor, Staffordshire

Other uses
Beeston Brewery Company, a brewery based in Beeston, Nottinghamshire (1880–1922)

See also 
Breaston, Derbyshire